Rich Fisher may refer to:

 Rich Fisher, a figure connected with the Fisher King in Arthurian legend
 Rich Fisher (news anchor) (1949–2017), American television presenter